Jason Steve Banton (born 15 December 1992) is an former English footballer who played as a winger. 

An England under-17 international, he had a number of clubs as a young player, spending time at Arsenal, Blackburn Rovers, Liverpool and Leicester City, before making his debut in the Football League on loan at Burton Albion in October 2011. He signed with Crystal Palace in 2012, and was loaned out to Plymouth Argyle and Milton Keynes Dons before joining Plymouth permanently in January 2014. He signed with Wycombe Wanderers in June 2015, and spent a brief time on loan at Hartlepool United. On 13 February 2016, he signed for Notts County until the end of the 2015–16 season, he was released by Notts at the end of the season and signed for Crawley Town, subsequently going on loan to Scottish Premiership side Partick Thistle. At the end of the 2016–17 season Banton was released by Crawley and joined National League Woking. On 20 June 2018, he joined Gary Owers' National League South challengers Torquay United. Banton went onto have spells at Braintree Town, Romford and Cray Wanderers before eventually joining Kingstonian ahead of the 2021–22 campaign.He signed with Sittingbourne FC in June 2022. In October 2022, Banton signed for Herne Bay. In December 2022, Banton transferred to Brightlingsea Regent.

Playing career
Banton was born in Tottenham. He began playing for Arsenal's youth teams at the age of seven and progressed through their academy to be offered scholarship terms. He left Arsenal in 2008 after becoming "disillusioned" by his lack of progress, and signed with Blackburn Rovers in October. In his first year with the club, Banton was the top-scorer in their academy side. Banton had his contract at Blackburn terminated towards the end of 2010. He joined Liverpool in January 2011 after spending time there on trial. Banton was released at the end of the season without making a first-team appearance for the club.

He signed a one-year contract with Leicester City in summer 2011. He joined Burton Albion on loan for one month on 30 September, and made his first-team debut the next day against Bradford City. Banton returned to Leicester without making another appearance for Burton and had his contract cancelled by mutual consent in December.

In January 2012, Banton signed with Major League Soccer and entered the MLS SuperDraft. He was selected by Seattle Sounders in the second round of the 2012 MLS Supplemental Draft as the 34th pick overall. Describing his position in the draft, Banton said: "It doesn't mean anything. I'm just glad to get the opportunity to come to Seattle." The club's technical director Chris Henderson said: "We think he's a guy who, depending on how things play out with our wingers, can step in on either flank." Banton was cut by the Sounders in February after attending training camps in Washington and Arizona.

Banton then returned to England and joined Crystal Palace on trial in the summer, where he was given a contract through to the end of the 2012–13 season in October. He made his first-team debut for Palace in an FA Cup tie against Stoke City in January 2013. Later that month, Banton joined Plymouth Argyle on loan until March. "He can be a very exciting player," said manager John Sheridan. "I thought it was important we got a player who is going to gain us that ground, 30 or 40 yards on up the pitch, quickly." Banton made his debut in a 0–0 draw with Dagenham & Redbridge, and scored both goals in a 2–1 win at Aldershot Town a week later. In March, he signed a new one-year contract with Palace and extended his loan with Argyle until the end of the season. Banton won the Football League Two Player of the Month award for March after scoring three goals in six appearances. In all, he played in 14 matches for Argyle and scored six goals before being recalled by Palace in April.

At the start of the 2013–14 season, he moved to Milton Keynes Dons on loan until January 2014. Banton made his debut against Shrewsbury Town on 3 August and scored his first goal for the club in a League Cup tie at Northampton Town three days later. He scored two more goals and had made 17 appearances in all competitions before losing his place in the team in December. Having not played in a first team game for nearly a month, and with his loan due to expire, he returned to Crystal Palace at the start of January.

In January 2014, Banton rejoined Plymouth Argyle permanently by signing an 18-month contract. He helped the "Pilgrims" to reach the League Two play-offs in 2014–15, and scored against Wycombe Wanderers in the semi-final first leg at Home Park, though Plymouth lost the tie 5–3 on aggregate. He was released at the end of the 2014–15 season.

In June 2015, Banton joined League Two side Wycombe Wanderers on a one-year contract after impressing manager Gareth Ainsworth in the play-off semi-final encounter against the club. However, having found first-team opportunities hard to come by, in October he moved on loan to Hartlepool United after being described by manager Ronnie Moore as a "winner". He returned to his parent club a month later after having his loan spell cut short. He began training with Port Vale in January 2016 as manager Rob Page considered a loan or transfer deal. Page chose not to sign him due to Banton's lack of match fitness, though Banton still had his contract with Wycombe cancelled by mutual consent. He had a trial with Notts County the following month.

On 13 February 2016, following a successful trial, Banton joined fellow League Two side Notts County on a deal for the remainder of the 2015–16 campaign. Three days later, Banton made his Notts County in their 3–2 away victory against Hartlepool United, featuring for 76 minutes before being replaced by Adam Campbell. Banton went onto feature eight more times for Notts County, before leaving the club at the end of the campaign upon the expiry of his current deal.

On 24 May 2016, it was announced that Banton had signed a one-year contract at League Two side Crawley Town. On the opening day of the 2016–17 campaign, Banton made his Crawley debut in their 1–0 home victory against his former club; Wycombe Wanderers. In which, Banton featured for 82 minutes before being replaced by Billy Clifford. Although Banton impressed within his first few months at Crawley, he was dropped by manager Dermot Drummy and was instead sent out on loan to Scottish side Partick Thistle on loan for the remainder of the campaign. Within his first week at Partick Thistle, Banton suffered an injury which ruled him out for the rest of the season and he therefore, failed to make an appearance for the Jags.

On 30 May 2017, it was announced that Banton would leave Crawley upon the expiry of his contract in June 2017.

On 27 June 2017, it was announced that Banton had signed for National League side Woking. After struggling with a thigh injury, Banton made his Woking debut on 19 August 2017, during their league tie against Leyton Orient, replacing Bobson Bawling in the 2–0 defeat. On 2 September 2017, Banton scored his first Woking goal courtesy of an error by Macclesfield Town goalkeeper Shwan Jalal, during the Cards' 3–1 victory. Just over a week later, Banton scored Woking's first during their 2–1 home victory over Solihull Moors.

On 16 May 2018, during the unveiling of new manager Alan Dowson, it was announced by the director of football, Geoff Chapple, that Banton's two-year deal had been terminated.

Following his release from Woking, Banton joined newly relegated National League South side Torquay United on a one-year deal.

After four months at Braintree Town, Banton joined Romford on 6 December 2019.

Banton joined Isthmian League Premier Division side Cray Wanderers ahead of their 2020–21 season. When the UK entered a second lockdown due to the COVID-19 pandemic in the United Kingdom, Cray Wanderers were unable to play, so Banton went on dual-registration with Braintree Town.

On 27 May 2021, Banton agreed to join Kingstonian ahead of the 2021–22 campaign and went onto make his debut during a 1–0 victory over Haringey Borough.

In February 2022, he signed for Isthmian League rivals Bishop's Stortford on loan, with 'The Blues'' sat in the play-off places on the hunt for promotion.

In June 2022, Banton joined Sittingbourne.

In October 2022, Banton signed for Herne Bay.

In December 2022, Banton transferred to Brightlingsea Regent after making 8 appearances for Herne Bay.

On 14 March 2023, Banton announced his retirement from football.

Career statistics

References

External links

1992 births
Living people
Footballers from Tottenham
English footballers
England youth international footballers
Black British sportspeople
Association football wingers
Association football forwards
Arsenal F.C. players
Tottenham Hotspur F.C. players
Blackburn Rovers F.C. players
Liverpool F.C. players
Leicester City F.C. players
Burton Albion F.C. players
Seattle Sounders FC draft picks
Crystal Palace F.C. players
Plymouth Argyle F.C. players
Milton Keynes Dons F.C. players
Wycombe Wanderers F.C. players
Hartlepool United F.C. players
Notts County F.C. players
Crawley Town F.C. players
Partick Thistle F.C. players
Woking F.C. players
Torquay United F.C. players
St Albans City F.C. players
Dulwich Hamlet F.C. players
Truro City F.C. players
Braintree Town F.C. players
Romford F.C. players
Cray Wanderers F.C. players
Kingstonian F.C. players
Bishop's Stortford F.C. players
Sittingbourne F.C. players
Herne Bay F.C. players
Brightlingsea Regent F.C. players
English Football League players
Scottish Professional Football League players
National League (English football) players
Isthmian League players